The 2010 Pan American Cycling Championships took place in Aguascalientes, Mexico on May 8–15, 2010.

Medal summary

Road

Men

Women

Track

Men

Women

Notes
 Sarah Hammer set a world record of 3'22"269 in the qualification round of the women's individual pursuit.
 The United States set a world record of 3'19"569 to win the women's team pursuit.

Medal table

References

Americas
Americas
Cycling
Pan American Road and Track Championships
International cycle races hosted by Mexico